Dainius Adomaitis (born 19 January 1974) is a Lithuanian former professional basketball player and the head coach for Alvark Tokyo of Japan's B.League.

Professional career
He started his career in Statyba Vilnius. Later he moved to Žalgiris Kaunas and became champion of the EuroLeague. After the successful season in Žalgiris Kaunas he moved to Zucchetti Montecatini, but he did not fit there. Therefore, he moved to Anwil Włocławek, and later to Śląsk Wrocław and finally in 2003 he arrived to BCM Gravelines. He became the captain of this team just a year later. Nevertheless, at the end of 2006–2007 season during the change of coaches, he left to Barons/LMT Riga. In August 2009 he announced the end of his career.

National team career
Adomaitis was a member of the Lithuanian national team, which won the bronze medal at the 2000 Olympic Games.

Coaching career
On 22 August 2009 he was named an assistant coach of the Polish team Czarni Słupsk. On 23 March 2010 he was promoted to be the head coach of the team.

In June 2012, he signed a contract with Anwil Włocławek to be the head coach, but he was fired the same year because of bad team results. On 19 November 2012 he joined the Lithuanian team Lietuvos rytas Vilnius as assistant coach of head coach Darius Maskoliūnas. After shortly performing as the head coach of Lietuvos rytas, he joined Juventus Utena and was named best coach of the 2014–15 LKL season.

In 2015, he joined Neptūnas and was once again named best coach of the LKL season after coaching Neptūnas to the LKL finals.

On 21 June 2018 Adomaitis was hired as head coach by Rytas Vilnius of the Lithuanian Basketball League. On 2 June 2020 Adomaitis and Rytas Vilnius agreed to mutually part ways after both sides could not agree on a contract extension.

On 14 January 2021 Adomaitis signed as head coach with Hapoel Jerusalem of the Israeli Basketball Premier League. On 9 April 2021 the two sides parted ways.

On 18 December 2021 Adomatis signed with Neptūnas Klaipėda for the rest of the season.

On 1 July 2022 it was announced that Adomaitis signed with Alvark Tokyo which competes in Japan's B.League.

Lithuanian national team (2016–2019)
On 25 October 2016 Adomaitis was appointed as head coach for the Lithuanian national basketball team, following the departure of Jonas Kazlauskas shortly after the 2016 Rio Olympics. He left the Lithuanian national team after the 2019 FIBA Basketball World Cup, where the Lithuanian team was eliminated from the quarterfinals.

Career statistics

EuroLeague

|-
| style="text-align:left;"|2001–02
| style="text-align:left;" rowspan="2"|Śląsk Wrocław
| 14 || 9 || 30.4 || .505 || .475 || .692 || 4.1 || 1.4 || .4 || .2 || 10.8 || 9.9
|-| style="text-align:left;"|2002–03
| 14 || 8 || 28.4 || .468 || .533 || .833 || 3.4 || 1.3 || .9''' || .1 || 8.2 || 9.6
|- class="sortbottom"
| style="text-align:center;" colspan="2"|Career
| 28 || 17 || 29.3 || .489 || .500 || .744 || 3.8 || 1.4 || .6 || .2 || 9.5 || 9.7

References

1974 births
Living people
1998 FIBA World Championship players
Basketball players at the 2000 Summer Olympics
BCM Gravelines players
BC Rytas coaches
BC Neptūnas coaches
BC Statyba players
BC Žalgiris players
BK Barons players
KK Włocławek players
Lithuanian basketball coaches
Lithuanian expatriate basketball people in France
Lithuanian expatriate basketball people in Italy
Lithuanian expatriate basketball people in Latvia
Lithuanian expatriate basketball people in Poland
Lithuanian men's basketball players
Medalists at the 2000 Summer Olympics
Olympic basketball players of Lithuania
Olympic bronze medalists for Lithuania
Olympic medalists in basketball
People from Šakiai
Shooting guards
Śląsk Wrocław basketball players
Small forwards